Rachel Hollivay (born October 24, 1993) is a former American professional basketball player. She was drafted in the second round of the 2016 WNBA Draft by the Atlanta Dream and spent two years playing for them. She played college basketball at Rutgers.

College career
Hollivay came out of high school ranked 9th overall in the 2012 HoopGurlz Rankings. Hollivay committed to play for Rutgers and join the Scarlet Knights after averaging 25 points, 11 rebounds and 10 blocks during her junior year at Heritage Academy.

During her time at Rutgers, Hollivay was known on the defensive end. She was one of the best rebounders on the team, but she became the Rutger's all-time leader in blocked shots during her senior year - finishing with 322 career blocks. During her senior season, Hollivay was also named to the All-Big Ten Honorable Mention Team, as well as the All-Defensive Team.

Professional career

Atlanta Dream
Hollivay was selected 13th overall in the 2016 WNBA Draft by the Atlanta Dream. Hollivay played two seasons in Atlanta before being waived before the 2018 season.

Career statistics

College

WNBA

Regular Season

|-
| align="left" | 2016
| align="left" | Atlanta
| 32 || 1 || 8.9 || .316 || – || .469 || 2.1 || 0.1 || 0.1 || 0.4 || 0.3 || 1.2
|-
| align="left" | 2017
| align="left" | Atlanta
| 7 || 1 || 4.9 || .667 || – || .500'' || 1.3 || 0.0 || 0.0 || 0.3 || 0.1 || 1.3'''
|-
| align="left" | Career
| align="left" | 2 year, 1 team
| 39 || 2 || 8.2 || .364 || .000 || .471 || 1.9 || 0.1 || 0.1 || 0.4 || 0.3 || 1.2

References

External links
WNBA bio
Rutgers Scarlet Knights bio

1993 births
Living people
American women's basketball players
Basketball players from Mississippi
Centers (basketball)
Rutgers
Atlanta Dream draft picks
Atlanta Dream players
People from Columbus, Mississippi